Fabian Schiller (born 24 May 1997) is a German racing driver who currently competes in the Nürburgring Endurance Series.

Career

Junior formula
Schiller began his racing career in karting at the age of 12, competing in the ADAC Kart Masters series. In 2012, he began competing in single-seater formula cars, taking part in the Formula BMW Talent Cup. The following season, Schiller stepped up to compete in the ADAC Formel Masters championship, competing for the Schiller Motorsport team run by his father and uncle. He would finish 11th in his first season in the competition, scoring his first victory at the Lausitzring. After two years of competition and three race victories in the series, Schiller graduated to the FIA Formula 3 European Championship, signing with Team West-Tec for the 2015 season. However, with three races remaining in the season, Schiller was removed from his seat due to unsatisfactory performances.

Sports cars
In March 2016, Schiller joined Marc VDS Racing Team for the 2016 edition of the Renault Sport Trophy. Schiller found much success over the course of the season, winning both the individual AM class championship and the Endurance Trophy alongside co-driver Markus Palttala. That same year, Schiller made his first appearance at the 24 Hours of Nürburgring, competing in the SP7 class. The team would finish sixth in class, completing 85 of the leader's 124 laps.

At the end of 2016, Schiller announced that he'd be competing for Race Performance in the LMP2 class of the Asian Le Mans Series. After winning his first race in the series at Fuji, the team finished fourth at Buriram and second at Sepang, finishing fourth in points. For 2017, Schiller raced in the Blancpain GT Series Sprint Cup, winning the Silver Cup title with co-driver Jules Szymkowiak.

Two years later, Schiller made his debut in the IMSA SportsCar Championship at the 2019 24 Hours of Daytona, driving for P1 Motorsports. After retiring, the entry finished 19th in class. Two seasons later, Schiller returned to the series, competing with DragonSpeed in the LMP2 class. The team finished on the podium in class, four laps behind the second-placed Tower Motorsport by Starworks entry.

Schiller embarked on two full-time programs in 2022, taking part in the ADAC GT Masters and GT World Challenge Europe Endurance Cup in Mercedes-AMG machinery. For the ADAC GT Masters season, Schiller teamed with Jules Gounon, driving for Drago Racing Team ZVO. The team claimed four victories, finishing third in the championship and leading a championship-high 137 laps. In GT World Challenge, Schiller joined Al Faisal Al Zubair and Axcil Jefferies behind the wheel of a Silver Cup entry fielded under the Al Manar Racing by HRT banner. The team claimed a class victory at Circuit Paul Ricard, finishing fourth in the class championship. Later that year, Schiller joined Valentin Pierburg in Team Germany's entry into the GT Relay competition at the 2022 FIA Motorsport Games. The duo swept the two qualifying races, before finishing as runners-up in the medal race. Schiller closed nearly 30 seconds to the leading car of Eric Debard before a late safety car ended the race under full-course yellow conditions.

In 2023, after two years in lower classes, Schiller returned to the Pro class of the GT World Challenge Europe Endurance Cup. He joined co-drivers Luca Stolz and Maro Engel behind the wheel of GetSpeed Performance's sole Pro entry.

Racing record

Career summary
* Season still in progress.

Complete FIA Formula 3 European Championship results
(key) (Races in bold indicate pole position) (Races in italics indicate fastest lap)

Complete WeatherTech SportsCar Championship results
(key) (Races in bold indicate pole position)

† Points only counted towards the Michelin Endurance Cup, and not the overall LMP2 Championship.

References

External links
Fabian Schiller at IMSA
Fabian Schiller at Racing Reference

1997 births
Living people
German racing drivers
24 Hours of Daytona drivers
WeatherTech SportsCar Championship drivers
Blancpain Endurance Series drivers
FIA Formula 3 European Championship drivers
ADAC Formel Masters drivers
People from Troisdorf
Sportspeople from Cologne (region)
Racing drivers from North Rhine-Westphalia
Euroformula Open Championship drivers
Asian Le Mans Series drivers
24H Series drivers
ADAC GT Masters drivers
International GT Open drivers
Mercedes-AMG Motorsport drivers
Team West-Tec drivers
DragonSpeed drivers
Formula BMW drivers
Schnitzer Motorsport drivers
Nürburgring 24 Hours drivers
FIA Motorsport Games drivers